Events from the year 2014 in Vatican City.

Incumbents 
 Sovereign Pontiff (Pope): Pope Francis

Events

January 
 5 January – 50th anniversary of the meeting between Pope Paul VI and Patriarch Athenagoras I of Constantinople. An international trip for Pope Francis is announced for the Holy Land to meet Bartholomew I.
 12 January – Announcement of the creation of 19 new cardinals: 16 eligible to vote in future papal conclaves and 3 non-voting cardinals.

February 
 17–19 February – The 3rd meeting of the Council of Cardinal Advisers. This council was the first attended by Cardinal Pietro Parolin.
 22 February – 19 new cardinals elevated by Pope Francis in the presence of Pope Emeritus Benedict XVI.
 24 February – Establishment of the Secretariat for the Economy.

March 
 8 March – The nomination for five years of the 15 members of the Secretariat for the Economy.
 22 March – Creation of the Pontifical Commission for the Protection of Minors.

April 
 3 April – The equivalent canonizations of José de Anchieta, Marie of the Incarnation and Francis-Xavier de Montmorency-Laval.
 27 April – Canonization of Pope John XXIII and Pope John Paul II in the presence of Pope Emeritus Benedict XVI
 28–30 April – The 4th meeting of the Council of Cardinal Advisers.

May

June

July 
 1–4 July – The 5th meeting of the Council of Cardinal Advisers.

August

September 
 15–17 September – The 6th meeting of the Council of Cardinal Advisers.

October 
 5–19 October – Extraordinary General Synod of Bishops on the topic of the pastoral challenges to the family.
 19 October – Beatification of Pope Paul VI.

November 
 23 November – The canonization of Giovanni Antonio Farina, Kuriakose Elias Chavara, Ludovico of Casoria, Nicholas Longobardi, Amato Ronconi and Euphrasia Eluvathingal.

December 
 20 December – nomination of Jean-Louis Tauran as vice-camerlengo of the Roman Catholic church.

Deaths

See also 

 Roman Catholic Church
 2014 in Europe
 City states

References 

 
Vatican City
Vatican City
2010s in Vatican City
Years of the 21st century in Vatican City